Govinda Bahadur Malla “Gothale“ (Nepali:गोविन्द बहादुर मल्ल “गोठाले”; 1922-2010) was a writer of Nepal. He is most well known for his novel Pallo Gharko Jhyal. He was awarded with Jagadamba Shree Puraskar in 2055 BS for his contribution to Nepalese literature.

Biography 
He was born on  12 July 1922 (29 Ashadh 1979 BS) to father Riddhi Bahadur Malla and mother Ananda Maya Malla in Kathmandu. He was schooled in Benaras, India followed by Durbar High School and Tri-Chandra College. He studied up to I.Sc. His works have been awarded multiple times. Some of his works are also a part of the curriculum in Nepali schools. He stopped writing after 1964. His brother Bijaya Malla is also a writer.

Works
Mamata, a collection of poems, written in 1992 BS was his first publication. The most popular work of Malla is Pallo Ghar ko Jhyal, a novel. Malla has written numerous novels, stories and plays. Some of them are:
 Gothaleko Kahta Sangraha
 Pallo Gharko Jhyal (Novel, 2016 BS)
 Prem ra Mrityu
 Kathai Kahta (Short stories, 2016 BS)
 Bhus ko Aago (Play,2013 BS)
 Bhoko Ghar (Essays, 2034 BS)
 Chaytiyeko Parda (Play, 2016 BS)
 Dosh Kasko Chaina (Play, 2027 BS)
 Barha Katha (Short stories, 2052 BS)
 Arpana (Novel, 2053 BS)
 Piyanani (Novel, 2056 BS)

Awards
 Jagadamba Shree Purasakar (2055 BS)
 Nepal Rajkiya Pragya Pratisthan Manartha Sadasya, (2033 BS)
 Gorkha Dakshin Bahu Award, Second Class (2036 BS)
 Tribhuwan Pragya Award(2043 BS)
 Bhawani Sahityik Patrakarita Award (2045 BS)
 Bed Nidhi Award (2049 BS)
 Sarwashrestha Rachana Awards (2050 BS)
 Pahalman Singh Swar Award (2052 BS)
 Sarawshrestha Pandulipi Award (2053 BS)
 Shanti Puraskar (2054 BS)

References

External links
Interview in Nepali

Nepalese male novelists
1979 births
Durbar High School alumni
Tri-Chandra College alumni
Jagadamba Shree Puraskar winners
2010 deaths